Shivanand Goswami| Shiromani Bhatt (Hindi/ Sanskrit : शिवानन्द गोस्वामी | शिरोमणि भट्ट ).(estimated period: Samvat 1710–1797) was a poet and a scholar of Literature, Poetics, Ayurveda, Orientology, Veda-Vedang, Ritualism, Theology, Astronomy, Astrology (Hora Shastra), Sanskrit Grammar and a practitioner of Tantra-Mantra etc.

Born in Kanchipuram, Tamil Nadu, his ancestors were originally Tamil and Telugu-speaking Panchadravida Vellanadu Brahmins, who later settled in Rajasthan, Madhya Pradesh, Uttar Pradesh and other provinces of North India on the request and invitation of some of the North Indian kings. His father was Shri Jaganniwas Bhatt (First) who was invited by Bundelkhand king Devi Singh to accept as his Rajguru. Later, Amber King Bishan Singh, father of Sawai Jai Singh II, invited his son Goswami to his capital town to perform a Vajpeya-Yagna and accepted him as Rajguru of Kachchawa-clan.

Birth 
Goswami's exact birth year and location are unknown. Researchers such as Prakash Parimal have recorded the birth year of Goswami as Vikram Samvat 1710 (year 1575 AD). Some researchers think he may have been born in Orchha, as Shivanandji's father Shri Jaganniwas Bhatt was invited by the King of Orchha as his Rajguru to settle there or at Kanchipuram - which was the native town of all his forefathers.

Family 
According to historical sources, the family tree up to Goswami is available as follows - similar information is published in "UttarBharteeya Andhra-Tailang-Bhatta-Goswami Vanshvriksha" compiled by Balkrishna Raw (2012). Goswami Harikrishna Shastry in his book "Vansha-Prashasti" (Mahapura-Shakha) (published in 1967(?)) has also narrated that the predecessors of Goswami had originally hailed from Shivakanchi-Vishnukanchi town situated near Penna river in Panampatta-Tamilnadu. Out of these Brahmin-scholars Samarpungava Dikshitar was one of the well known pundits of his times in India. He penned many books out of which "yatra-Prabandh" and Adwaita-Vidyatilakam  are well known. He was also a specialist of conducting various traditional VAIDIK-Yagnas like Ashwamedha Yagna and Vajpeya-Yagna.

Surname 
Most likely Shriwas Bhatt I, the grandfather of Shivanandji Maharaj, may be the first one of his family to have migrated from Tamilnadu to north India. In his youth, Bhatt I had practised tantra-shastra under the guidance of respected sage Deshikendra Satchidananda Sundaracharya of Jallandhar-Peeth, and obtained formal "deeksha" as his disciple. Shriniwas Bhatt was bestowed the title of "Goswami" on completion of his training in tantra by his guru Satchidananda Sundaracharya in samvat 1660 (year 1525 AD) and renamed as Goswami Vidyanand Nath. Since he was a worshiper of Godless Tripura Sundari or ([Lalita] | [Lalitha]), another name he was given was Goswami Lalitananda. It is thus clear that "Goswami" is not associated with the caste to which these migrated south indian Aatreya-gotra brahmins belong by birth, but a title or honorific denoting their mastery of ancient scriptures and Tantric-practices.

Shivananda Goswami was a devoted worshiper of Goddess Tripura Sundari. Many incidents describe him having occult-powers as a psychic and tantra-exponent. After Shrimad Bhagwat, the credit of writing the text Singh-Siddhant-Sindhu goes to Shivananda Goswami. Singh-Siddhant-Sindhu VS.173 (1674 AD) has 35,130 Sanskrit verses, much more than the total number of verses contained in the Srimad Bhagavatam. (To be precise, Srimad Bhagavatam has 18 thousand verses, 335 chapters and 12 skandhas.) Singh-siddhanta-Sindhu is probably the largest book of its kind, consisting of much reference material from numerous scriptures.

 Death 
It is widely believed that in spite of being respected and patronized by many of the Indian kings and noblemen, Goswami spent his last days in Bikaner with Anup Singh, the Maharaja, where he died - somewhere in South India, or in Bikaner - it is also a matter of research.

 Simha-Siddhanta-Sindhu 
Despite the fact that its handwritten manuscript was available in the Anup Sanskrit Library of Bikaner, its publication saw the light of the day almost after four hundred years of writing, but fortunately it is now accessible in print-form. Rajasthan Oriental Research Institute of Jodhpur has published the work in three volumes under the editorship of Pandit Laxminarayan Goswami. The third volume was also published as an e-book by exoticindiaart.com. This book is encyclopedic in nature and contains thousands of excerpts from many disciplines like Sanskrit poetry, Tantra, Mantra-Shastra, Nyaya, Aagama-Nigama, Dharmashastras, Mimansa, Sutras, Ethics, Astrology, Veda-Vedang, Grammar, Medicine, Ayurveda, Yagya-Vidhi, Rituals, Dharmashastra, and Horashastra etc. Two more volumes of this book are under print from Rajasthan Oriental Research Institute as indicated by the editor. 

 Other works

Goswami has written more than thirty-five Sanskrit books. (Source : Genealogical Tree of Tailang-Brahmans: 1942) Except for Champu-kavya most of his works are written in poetry-form. The list of citations of the first ten Tarangas ('waves') of 'Singh Siddhanta Sindhu' has been published in Chennai (Madras). He was primarily an exclusive-worshiper of Tripura-Sundari (Goddess). As a result of his commitment to power-worship, earned through Srividya, he was bestowed with the title of Sakshi-Natya-Shiromani' by the Pandit-community of Varanasi
 
His 30 available works (mostly handwritten manuscripts) in Anup Sanskrit Library, Bikaner, Pothikhana of City-Palace, Jaipur, Bhandarkar Oriental Research Institute, Pune and elsewhere are as follows :

1. Singh-Siddhant-Sindhu (1674 AD) सिंहसिद्धांतसिन्धु 
 
2. Singh-siddhant-pradeepak सिंह सिद्धांत प्रदीपक 
 
3. Subodh Roopawali सुबोध रूपावली 
 
4. Srividyayasparyakram-darpan श्रीविद्यास्यपर्याक्रम-दर्पण
 
5. Vidyarchandipika विद्यार्चनदीपिका
 
6. Lalitarchana-kaumudi ललितार्चन-कौमुदी
 
7. Laxminarayanarcha-kaumudi लक्ष्मीनारायणार्चा-कौमुदी
 
8. Laxminarayan-Stuti लक्ष्मीनारायण-स्तुति 
 
9. Subhgodaya Darpana सुभगोदय-दर्पण
 
10. Aacharyasindhu आचारसिन्धु
 
11. Pyayashchittaranava-Sanket  प्रयाश्चित्तारणव-संकेत
 
12. Aanhikaratna आन्हिकरत्न
 
13. Mahabharat-subhashit-shloka-Sangraha महाभारत-सुभाषित-श्लोक-संग्रह
 
14. Vyavahara-Nirnaya व्यवहारनिर्णय
 
15. Vaidyaratna वैद्यरत्न
 
16. Muhurtaratna मुहूर्तरत्न
 
17. Kala-Viveka काल-विवेक
 
18. Tithi-nirnaya तिथिनिर्णय
 
19. Amarkoshsya Balbodhini Teeka अमरकोशस्य बालबोधिनी टीका
 
20. Stree-Pratyaya-Kosh स्त्री-प्रत्ययकोश
 
21. Karka-Kosh कारक-कोश
 
22. Samaas-kosh समास-कोश
 
23. Shabda-Bhed-Prakash शब्द भेद प्रकाश 
 
24. Aakhyaanwada आख्यानवाद
 
25. Padartha tatva nirupana पदार्थतत्वनिरूपण
 
26. naya-vivek नय-विवेक
 
27. Ishwarastuti ईश्वरस्तुति
 
28. Kulpredeep कुलप्रदीप
 
29. Shri-Chandra-Pooja-Prayog श्रीचंद्रपूजा-प्रयोग
 
30. Niyarchankathana नित्यार्चन-कथन

Honors/ Felititions and Jagirs 
In the seventh generation of Orchha Kings, Devi Singh (1635–1641 AD) bestowed the jagir of 4 villages in Bundelkhand Madhya Pradesh to Goswami after obtaining 'Sri Vidya mantra-diksha' from him.
In the year 1692–1694, Amber king Bishan Singh presented him the jagirs of Ramjipura (on which the Malviya Nagar of Jaipur is built today), along with Harivanshpura, Chimanpura and Mahapura, the written evidence of which is still preserved in an inscription of 'Pothikhana' (Royal Library) of City-Palace of Jaipur, Mahapura village has become a part of Jaipur metropolis today. The descendants of Goswami ji and his brother Janardan Goswami have lived in Amber/Mahapura. It was here in 1922 that the Sanskrit litterateur Bhatt Mathuranath Shastri was married to Ramadevi Bhatt, the daughter of Acharya Gopikrishna Goswami गोपीकृष्ण गोस्वामी a descendant of Shivanand and a well-versed scholar of Shrimad Bhagwat Mahapuran. When Shivanand ji decided to settle in Bikaner (leaving his property-villages in Jaipur) The jagirs of two villages - Pulasar and Chilkoi were first presented to Goswamiji by Raja Anup Singh of Bikaner (1669-98 AD). It is generally believed that Shivanand Goswami remained in Bikaner till the end of his life. Perhaps he died there too - but unfortunately there is no historical evidence available about his last days spent in royal patronage of Bikaner, as already indicated above.

After Shivanand ji, his worthy sons also continued with many academic-achievements in the Bikaner state, keeping their family tradition intact, as is proved from the following English document of Bikaner archives–

External links
 https://www.yumpu.com/en/document/view/51655433/river-kaveri-thanjavur-parampara
 https://www.no-regime.com/ru-it/wiki/Gangadhara_Vajapeyi
 https://wiki.yoga-vidya.de/Appayya_Dikshitar
 http://ignca.gov.in/Asi_data/16364.pdf
 https://sanskritdocuments.org/sites/prkannan/Balabodha%20Sangraham%20-%202.pdf
 https://collections.ed.ac.uk/guardbook/record/98940/1/S5_redux.pdf
 https://books.google.co.in/books?id=gKKaDAAAQBAJ&pg=PA59&lpg=PA59&dq=samarapungava+dikshitar&source=bl&ots=G0OiEQab1p&sig=ACfU3U0NQdS3TiOWsIlHiuImISZKLOKWhQ&hl=en&sa=X&ved=2ahUKEwjqkPm52ez1AhVIBN4KHUfRDNo4HhDoAXoECCMQAw
 http://devigai.blogspot.com/p/inscriptions.html
 https://www.hmoob.in/hi/%E0%A4%B8%E0%A4%AE%E0%A4%B0%E0%A4%AA%E0%A5%81%E0%A4%82%E0%A4%97%E0%A4%B5_%E0%A4%A6%E0%A5%80%E0%A4%95%E0%A5%8D%E0%A4%B7%E0%A4%BF%E0%A4%A4
 https://vedicgoddess.weebly.com/research-texts-shastra.html
 https://librarycatalogue.nvli.in/cgi-bin/koha/opac-search.pl?q=su:%221%22
 https://nanopdf.com/download/a-list-of-scanned-sanskrit-books-at-iisc-bangalore_pdf
 https://digi.ub.uni-heidelberg.de/diglit/harrassowitz1927_408/0148/text_ocr
 https://www.myheritage.com/names/meenakshi_iyer</ref>

References 

17th-century Indian poets
Indian Sanskrit scholars